Asian Trekking is a commercial adventure company based out of Kathmandu, Nepal started by Sherpa Ang Tshering. In 2001, it was recorded that Asian Trekking ran 25 large mountain expeditions per year. Asian Trekking made international news in 2006 when four of its clients and two of its Sherpas died in a single season. One of their clients, David Sharp, died near the summit, and this event became the center of an international climbing ethics controversy. Founder of the company Ang said that climbers can die if they use all their energy getting to the summit of Mount Everest, only to be too fatigued of the descent.

Overview
Asian Trekking is known in mountaineering for providing "logistics only" Everest expeditions, which, although cheap, do not offer a lot of extras higher up the mountain. By providing logistics only, compared to guided or even non-guided climbs, Asian Trekking is typically cheaper and gives climbers more freedom. However, it offers few safe-guards. Asian Trekking sells unguided Everest expeditions for both the north and south side, specializing in supplying basic supplies and expedition organization such as hiring a local sherpa. Asian Trekking has also supported expeditions to Manaslu.

History
Asian Trekking has organized multiple years of Eco Everest Expeditions, and often provides logistics for many expeditions. Asian Trekking supported the 2001 International Everest Expedition. In 2009 Asian Trekking organized for several expeditions including the just mentioned Eco Everest Expedition 2009, Atumas Taiwanese 7 Summit and Everest Expedition 2009, International Adventure Alternative Everest Expedition 2009, 7 Summit Club Everest Expedition 2009, Kazak Lhotse-Everest Expedition 2009, and Indo Bangladesh Mount Makalu Expedition. They lost one person Lhakpa Nuru who died was supporting the Eco Everest Expedition.

In the year of 2006, multiple clients had died including David Sharp, Vitor Negrete, Thomas Weber, and Igor Plyushkin. In addition, two Asian Trekking Sherpas were killed on April 21, 2006, in a serac fall on the south side: Lhakpa Tseri and Dawa Temba.

At the time of his death, David Sharp was found to be in possession of a receipt for US$7,490, believed to be the whole financial cost with Asian Trekking. Comparatively, fully guided expeditions are between thirty and one hundred thousand US$ plus an additional twenty thousand in other expenses that range from gear to bonuses.

The Washington Times notes that Asian Trekking said Sharp did not take enough oxygen, and did not take a Sherpa helper, and was part of "loose group", not a climbing team all of which put him at higher risk. Asian Trekking services are cheap because they essentially end at base camp (unless they hire a guide). However, Brazilian Vitor Negrete, also climbing with Asian Trekking and possibly teaming with Sharp, died days later despite having a Sherpa helper. Vitor developed medical problems returning from the summit and died in the arms of his Sherpa assistant.

Asian Trekking has supported expeditions on the North and South sides of Mount Everest, and also to Lhotse. Asian Trekking has supported International Dream Everest and Eco Everest Expedition trips to Mount Everest. Lhakpa Nuru Sherpa was from Phurte, Nepal and is recorded to have died on May 7, 2009, on the south side of Everest.

In the aftermath of 2015 Mount Everest avalanche, Asian Trekking and Himex were reported to help injured people at their camps.

Examples of lost clients, employees, etc. connected with Asian Trekking:

Summiters/Expeditions

Everest 2013
Shera Gyalzen Sherpa
Pemba Tshering
David Liano Gonzalez
Samden Bhote 
Shishapangma 2013
Zoltan Benedek 
Batmanlai Ulzli-Orshikh

Jakob Urth attempted summit Lhotse supported by Asian Trekking.

See also
List of Mount Everest guides
List of Mount Everest records
List of Mount Everest expeditions
Nepal Mountaineering Association
Adventure Consultants
Himex
1996 Mount Everest disaster

References

External links
Outside Magazine article Over the Top about commercial Everest summiting circa 2006 (Including some examples of A.T. clients)
Official website

Mount Everest